This is a list of places in the United States named for Lewis Cass:

Counties 
 Cass County, Illinois 
 Cass County, Indiana 
 Cass County, Iowa 
 Cass County, Michigan 
 Cass County, Minnesota 
 Cass County, Missouri 
 Cass County, Nebraska 
 Cass County, Texas 
In addition, Bartow County, Georgia was formerly Cass County, until after the American Civil War.  (Cass County, North Dakota is not named for Lewis Cass but for railroad executive George Washington Cass.)

Cities, towns, or villages 
 Cass, West Virginia
 Cass City, Michigan
 Cass Lake, Minnesota
 Cassopolis, Michigan
 Casstown, Ohio
 Cassville, Georgia, formerly the county seat of Bartow County, Georgia, which was formerly Cass County, Georgia, until after the American Civil War
 Cassville, Missouri
 Cassville, New Jersey
 Cassville, Pennsylvania
 Cassville, Wisconsin
 Cassville, New York

Townships 
 Cass Township, Illinois, Fulton County, Illinois
 Cass Township, Clay County, Indiana
 Cass Township, Dubois County, Indiana
Cass Township, Greene County, Indiana
Cass Township, LaPorte County, Indiana
Cass Township, Ohio County, Indiana
Cass Township, Pulaski County, Indiana
Cass Township, Sullivan County, Indiana
Cass Township, White County, Indiana
Cass Township, Boone County, Iowa
Cass Township, Cass County, Iowa
Cass Township, Cedar County, Iowa
Cass Township, Clayton County, Iowa
Cass Township, Guthrie County, Iowa
Cass Township, Hamilton County, Iowa
Cass Township, Harrison County, Iowa
Cass Township, Jones County, Iowa
Cass Township, Shelby County, Iowa
Cass Township, Wapello County, Iowa
Cass Township, Douglas County, Missouri
Cass Township, Greene County, Missouri
Cass Township, Stone County, Missouri
Cass Township, Texas County, Missouri
Cass Township, Hancock County, Ohio
Cass Township, Muskingum County, Ohio
Cass Township, Richland County, Ohio
Cass Township, Oklahoma, Oklahoma County, Oklahoma
Cass Township, Huntingdon County, Pennsylvania
Cass Township, Schuylkill County, Pennsylvania
Cassville (town), Wisconsin

Geographical features
Cass Lake (Minnesota)
Cass Lake (Michigan)
Cass River, Michigan

Buildings
 Lewis Cass Technical High School, Detroit, Michigan
 Lewis Cass Jr. Sr High School, Walton, Indiana
 Lewis Cass Elementary School, Livonia, Michigan

Note: The Elliott-Larsen Building in Lansing, Michigan had been named for Lewis Cass until 2020, when Michigan Governor Gretchen Whitmer renamed the building for two Michigan civil rights pioneers, rather than Cass, a slaveholder who supported the expansion of slavery and expulsion of Native Americans from their lands.

Other
 Cass Corridor, Detroit, Michigan
 Cass Park and Cass Park Historic District, Detroit, Michigan
 Cass-Davenport Historic District, Detroit, Michigan
 Center Cass School District #66, Downers Grove, Illinois
 Cass Cliff, Mackinac Island, Michigan
Fort Cass

Note: Southwest Heritage Intermediate School District in Cass County, Michigan had been named Cass County ISD until 2021.  The school board renamed the district after a historical reevaluation of namesake Lewis Cass.

Streets 
 Cass Street, Exeter, New Hampshire
 Cass Place, Walnut Park, California
 Cass Avenue, Bay City, Michigan
 Cass Avenue, Grand Rapids, Michigan
 Cass Avenue, Detroit, Michigan
 Cass Avenue, Macomb County, Michigan
 Cass Street, Portsmouth, New Hampshire
 Cass Street, San Diego, California
 Cass Street, Omaha, Nebraska
 Cass Street, Milwaukee, Wisconsin
 Cass Avenue, St. Louis, Missouri
 Cass Street, Albion,  Michigan
 Cass Street, Dresden, Ohio
Note: Cass Street in Traverse City, Michigan and in Cadillac, Michigan were named for Lewis Cass's nephew, George Washington Cass.

Notes

References 
 
 
 

Cass, Lewis place names
Cass, Lewis
Cass